Da Ai Television (Chinese 大愛電視, dà ài diànshì) is a TV channel founded in 1998. It's operated by a Buddhist charity organisation Tzu Chi. The channel produces most of its programs by itself, and the programming doesn't include politics or violent content. The channel is religious by nature and it teaches dharma under Cheng Yen's guidance. The channel's stance is that people are good by default as Buddhism teaches.

The program is for the most part in Mandarin Chinese but some English content is also produced. For example Da Ai's Internet radio has one regular program in English called The Power of the Heart. Moreover, the channel has children's shows.

In 2012 the channel moved into HD quality.

References

External links 

 Da Ai's YouTube channel

Television stations in Taiwan
Television channels and stations established in 1998
Tzu Chi